Club Social y Deportivo Villa San Carlos is an Argentine football club from the city of Berisso (nearly La Plata) in Buenos Aires Province. The team currently plays in the Primera B Metropolitana, the regionalised third level of the Argentine football league system.

On May 25, 2013, San Carlos won the Primera B Metropolitana championship therefore promoting to Primera B Nacional. The squad beat Barracas Central by 1–0.

Players

Current squad

Out on loan

Notable coaches
  Marcelo Javier Zuleta
  Julián Camino

Honours
 Primera B:  2012–13
 Primera C: 2008–09
 Primera D: 1992–93, 2001–02

References

External links

Official website 

Association football clubs established in 1925
Villa
1925 establishments in Argentina